Robert Burton Rothel (September 17, 1923 – March 21, 1984) was a professional baseball player. He appeared in four games for the Cleveland Indians of Major League Baseball during the 1945 season as a third baseman.

Ken Keltner, the Indians' regular third baseman, had entered the Navy in March 1945. Regular right fielder Roy Cullenbine started the first three games of the season at third, a position he hadn't played in three years, but was moved back to right field when the team called up the 21-year-old Rothel from the Wilkes-Barre Barons. Rothel, in just his second season as a professional, started four games, but got just two hits in ten at bats, although he did walk three times. On the day of Rothel's last start, Cullenbine was traded to the Detroit Tigers in return for second baseman Dutch Meyer and, more pertinently, third baseman Don Ross. Rothel was returned to Wilkes-Barre. He played just one more season in the minor leagues before his career ended.

Rothel died of a self-inflicted gunshot wound in Huron, Ohio in 1984.

External links

Major League Baseball third basemen
Cleveland Indians players
Batavia Clippers players
Wilkes-Barre Barons players
Charleston Rebels players
Baseball players from Ohio
Suicides by firearm in Ohio
1923 births
1984 suicides